Tinosorb is the trade name of a number of UV absorbers:
Bemotrizinol (Tinosorb S)
Bisoctrizole (Tinosorb M)
Tris-Biphenyl Triazine (Tinosorb A2B)
Octyl methoxycinnamate (Tinosorb OMC)